Tianeptine, sold under the brand names Stablon and Coaxil among others, is an atypical tricyclic antidepressant which is used mainly in the treatment of major depressive disorder, although it may also be used to treat anxiety, asthma, and irritable bowel syndrome.

Tianeptine has antidepressant and anxiolytic effects with a relative lack of sedative, anticholinergic, and cardiovascular side effects. It has been found to act as an atypical agonist of the μ-opioid receptor with clinically negligible effects on the δ- and κ-opioid receptors.

Tianeptine was discovered and patented by the French Society of Medical Research in the 1960s. Currently, tianeptine is approved in France and manufactured and marketed by Laboratories Servier SA; it is also marketed in a number of other European countries under the trade name Coaxil as well as in Asia (including Singapore) and Latin America as Stablon and Tatinol but it is not available in Australia, Canada, New Zealand, or the United Kingdom.

Medical uses

Depression and anxiety
Tianeptine shows efficacy against serious depressive episodes (major depression), comparable to amitriptyline, imipramine and fluoxetine, but with significantly fewer side effects. It was shown to be more effective than maprotiline in a group of people with co-existing depression and anxiety. Tianeptine also displays significant anxiolytic properties and is useful in treating a spectrum of anxiety disorders including panic disorder, as evidenced by a study in which those administered 35% CO2 gas (carbogen) on paroxetine or tianeptine therapy showed equivalent panic-blocking effects. Like many antidepressants (including bupropion, the selective serotonin reuptake inhibitors, the serotonin-norepinephrine reuptake inhibitors, moclobemide and numerous others) it may also have a beneficial effect on cognition in people with depression-induced cognitive dysfunction.
A 2005 study in Egypt showed tianeptine to be effective in men with depression and erectile dysfunction.

Tianeptine has been found to be effective in depression, in people with Parkinson's disease, and with post-traumatic stress disorder for which it was as safe and effective as fluoxetine and moclobemide.

Other uses
A clinical trial comparing its efficacy and tolerability with amitriptyline in the treatment of irritable bowel syndrome showed that tianeptine was at least as effective as amitriptyline and produced fewer prominent adverse effects, such as dry mouth and constipation.

Tianeptine has been reported to be very effective for asthma. In August 1998, Dr. Fuad Lechin and colleagues at the Central University of Venezuela Institute of Experimental Medicine in Caracas published the results of a 52-week randomized controlled trial of asthmatic children; the children in the groups who received tianeptine had a sharp decrease in clinical rating and increased lung function. Two years earlier, they had found a close, positive association between free serotonin in plasma and severity of asthma in symptomatic persons. As tianeptine was the only agent known to both reduce free serotonin in plasma and enhance uptake in platelets, they decided to use it to see if reducing free serotonin levels in plasma would help. By November 2004, there had been two double-blind placebo-controlled crossover trials and an under-25,000 person open-label study lasting over seven years, both showing effectiveness.

Tianeptine also has anticonvulsant and analgesic effects, and a clinical trial in Spain that ended in January 2007 has shown that tianeptine is effective in treating pain due to fibromyalgia. Tianeptine has been shown to have efficacy with minimal side effects in the treatment of attention-deficit hyperactivity disorder.

Contraindications
Known contraindications include the following:
 Hypersensitivity to tianeptine or any of the tablet's excipients.

Side effects
Compared to other tricyclic antidepressants, it produces significantly fewer cardiovascular, anticholinergic (like dry mouth or constipation), sedative and appetite-stimulating effects. A recent review found that it was amongst the antidepressants most prone to causing hepatotoxicity (liver damage), although the evidence to support this concern was of limited quality. Unlike other tricyclic antidepressants, tianeptine does not affect heart function. μ-Opioid receptor agonists can sometimes induce euphoria, as does tianeptine, occasionally, at high doses, well above the normal therapeutic range. Tianeptine can also cause severe withdrawal symptoms after prolonged use at high doses which should prompt extreme caution.

By frequency
Sources:

Common (>1% frequency)

 Headache (up to 18%)
 Dizziness (up to 10%)
 Insomnia/nightmares (up to 20%)
 Drowsiness (up to 10%)
 Dry mouth (up to 20%)
 Constipation (up to 15%)
 Nausea
 Abdominal pain
 Weight gain (~3%)
 Agitation
 Anxiety/irritability

Uncommon (0.1-1% frequency)

 Bitter taste
 Flatulence
 Gastralgia
 Blurred vision
 Muscle aches
 Premature ventricular contractions
 Micturition disturbances
 Palpitations
 Orthostatic hypotension
 Hot flushes
 Tremor

Rare (<0.1% frequency)

 Hepatitis
 Hypomania
 Euphoria
 ECG changes
 Pruritus/allergic-type skin reactions
 Protracted muscle aches
 General fatigue

Pharmacology

Pharmacodynamics

Atypical μ-opioid receptor agonist
In 2014, tianeptine was found to be a μ-opioid receptor (MOR) full agonist using human proteins. It was also found to act as a full agonist of the δ-opioid receptor (DOR), although with approximately 200-fold lower potency. The same researchers subsequently found that the MOR is required for the acute and chronic antidepressant-like behavioral effects of tianeptine in mice and that its primary metabolite had similar activity as a MOR agonist but with a much longer elimination half-life. Moreover, in mice, although tianeptine produced other opioid-like behavioral effects such as analgesia and reward, it did not result in tolerance or withdrawal. The authors suggested that tianeptine may be acting as a biased agonist of the MOR and that this may be responsible for its atypical profile as a MOR agonist. However, there are reports that suggest that withdrawal effects resembling those of other typical opioid drugs (including but not limited to depression, insomnia, and cold/flu-like symptoms) do manifest following prolonged use at dosages far beyond the medical range. In addition to its therapeutic effects, activation of the MOR is likely to also be responsible for the abuse potential of tianeptine at high doses that are well above the normal therapeutic range and efficacy threshold.

In rats, when co-administered with morphine, tianeptine prevents morphine-induced respiratory depression without impairing analgesia. In humans, however, tianapine was found to increase respiratory depression when administered in conjunction with the potent opioid remifentanil.

Glutamatergic, neurotrophic, and neuroplastic modulation
Some researchers hypothesize that tianeptine has a protective effect against stress induced neuronal remodeling. There is also action on the NMDA and AMPA receptors. In animal models, tianeptine inhibits the pathological stress-induced changes in glutamatergic neurotransmission in the amygdala and hippocampus. It may also facilitate signal transduction at the CA3 commissural associational synapse by altering the phosphorylation state of glutamate receptors. With the discovery of the rapid and novel antidepressant effects of drugs such as ketamine, many believe the efficacy of antidepressants is related to promotion of synaptic plasticity. This may be achieved by regulating the excitatory amino acid systems that are responsible for changes in the strength of synaptic connections as well as enhancing BDNF expression, although these findings are based largely on preclinical studies.

Serotonin reuptake enhancer
Tianeptine is no longer labelled a Selective Serotonin Reuptake Enhancer (SSRE) antidepressant.
Tianeptine had been found to bind to the same allosteric site on the serotonin transporter (SERT) as conventional TCAs. However, whereas conventional TCAs inhibit serotonin reuptake by the SERT, tianeptine appeared to enhance it. This seems to be because of the unique C3 amino heptanoic acid side chain of tianeptine, which, in contrast to other TCAs, is thought to lock the SERT in a conformation that increases affinity for and reuptake (Vmax) of serotonin. As such, tianeptine was thought to act a positive allosteric modulator of the SERT, or as a "serotonin reuptake enhancer".

Although tianeptine was originally found to have no effect in vitro on monoamine reuptake, release, or receptor binding, upon acute and repeated administration, tianeptine decreased the extracellular levels of serotonin in rat brain without a decrease in serotonin release, leading to a theory of tianeptine enhancing serotonin reuptake. The (−)-enantiomer is more active in this sense than the (+)-enantiomer. However, more recent studies found that long-term administration of tianeptine does not elicit any marked alterations (neither increases nor decreases) in extracellular levels of serotonin in rats. However, coadministration of tianeptine and the selective serotonin reuptake inhibitor fluoxetine inhibited the effect of tianeptine on long-term potentiation in hippocampal CA1 area. This is considered an argument for the opposite effects of tianeptine and fluoxetine on serotonin uptake, although it has been shown that fluoxetine can be partially substituted for tianeptine in animal studies. In any case, the collective research suggests that direct modulation of the serotonin system is unlikely to be the mechanism of action underlying the antidepressant effects of tianeptine.

Other actions
Tianeptine modestly enhances the mesolimbic release of dopamine and potentiates CNS D2 and D3 receptors. Tianeptine has no affinity for the dopamine transporter or the dopamine receptors. CREB-TF (CREB, cAMP response element-binding protein) is a cellular transcription factor. It binds to certain DNA sequences called cAMP response elements (CRE), thereby increasing or decreasing the transcription of the genes. CREB has a well-documented role in neuronal plasticity and long-term memory formation in the brain. Cocaine- and amphetamine-regulated transcript, also known as CART, is a neuropeptide protein that in humans is encoded by the CARTPT gene. CART appears to have roles in reward, feeding, stress, and it has the functional properties of an endogenous psychostimulant. Taking into account that CART production is upregulated by CREB, it could be hypothesized that due to tianeptine's central role in BDNF and neuronal plasticity, this CREB may be the transcription cascade through which this drug enhances mesolimbic release of dopamine.

Research indicates possible anticonvulsant (anti-seizure) and analgesic (painkilling) activity of tianeptine via downstream modulation of adenosine A1 receptors (as the effects could be experimentally blocked by antagonists of this receptor). Tianpetine is also weak histone deacetylase inhibitor and analogs with increased potency and selectivity are developed.

Pharmacokinetics
The bioavailability of tianeptine is approximately 99%. Its plasma protein binding is about 95%. The metabolism of tianeptine is hepatic, via β-oxidation. CYP enzymes are not involved, which limits the potential for drug-drug interactions. Maximal concentration is reached in about an hour and the elimination half-life is 2.5 to 3 hours. The elimination half-life has been found to be increased to 4 to 9 hours in the elderly. Tianeptine is usually packaged as a sodium salt but can also be found as tianeptine sulfate, a slower-releasing formulation patented by Janssen in 2012. In 2022 Tonix Pharmaceuticals received permission from the US FDA to conduct phase II clinical trials on tianeptine hemioxalate extended-release tablets designed for once-daily use.

Tianeptine has two active metabolites, MC5 (a pentanoic acid derivative of the parent compound) and MC3 (a propionic acid derivative). MC5 has a longer elimination half-life of approximately 7.6 hours, and takes about a week to reach steady-state concentration under daily-dosing. MC5 is a mu-opioid agonist but not delta-opioid agonist, with EC50 at the mu-opioid receptor of 0.545 μM (vs 0.194 μM for tianeptine). MC3 is a very weak mu-opioid agonist, with an EC50 of 16 μM. Tianeptine is excreted 65% in the urine and 15% in feces.

Chemistry
In terms of chemical structure, it is similar to tricyclic antidepressants (TCAs), but it has significantly different pharmacology and important structural differences, so it is not usually grouped with them.

Analogues
Although several related compounds are disclosed in the original patent, no activity data are provided and it was unclear whether these share tianeptine's unique pharmacological effects. More recent structure-activity relationship studies have since been conducted, providing some further insight on μ-opioid, δ-opioid, and pharmacokinetical activity. Derivatives where the aromatic chlorine substituent is replaced by bromine, iodine or methylthio, and/or the heptanoic acid tail is varied in length or replaced with other groups such as 3-methoxypropyl, show similar or increased opioid receptor activity relative to tianeptine itself. Amineptine, the most closely related drug to have been widely studied, is a dopamine reuptake inhibitor with no significant effect on serotonin levels, nor opioid agonist activity. Tianeptinaline, analog of tianeptine, is a notable class I HDAC inhbitor.

Society and culture

Approval and brand names
Brand names include:

 Coaxil (BG, CZ, EE, HU, LT, LV, PL, RO, RU, UA)
 Salymbra (EE)
 Stablon (AR, AT, BR, FR, IN, ID, MY, MX, PK, PT, SG, SK, TH, TT, TR, VE)
 Tatinol (CN)
 Tiana Red or Tiana (US) 
 Tianeurax (DE)
 Tynept (IN)
 Zaza Red (US) 
 Zinosal (ES)

Development
Under the code names JNJ-39823277 and TPI-1062, tianeptine was previously under development for the treatment of major depressive disorder in the United States and Belgium. Phase I clinical trials were completed in Belgium and the United States in May and June 2009, respectively. For unclear reasons development of tianeptine was discontinued in both countries in January 2012.

The U.S. National Poison Data System data on tianeptine showed a nationwide increase in tianeptine exposure calls and calls related to abuse and misuse during 2014–2017.

Recreational use 
As a μ-opioid agonist, tianeptine in large doses has high abuse potential. In 2001, Singapore's Ministry of Health restricted tianeptine prescribing to psychiatrists due to its recreational potential, 
In 2003, Bahrain classified it a controlled substance due to increasing reports of misuse and recreational use.

Between 1989 and 2004, in France 141 cases of recreational use were identified, correlating to an incidence of 1 to 3 cases per 1000 persons treated with tianeptine and 45 between 2006 and 2011. According to Servier, stopping of treatment with tianeptine is difficult, due to the possibility of withdrawal symptoms in a person. The severity of the withdrawal is dependent on the daily dose, with high doses being extremely difficult to quit. Official DEA statement  states that the withdrawal symptoms in humans typically result in: agitation, nausea, vomiting, tachycardia, hypertension, diarrhea, tremor, and diaphoresis, similar to other opioid drugs.

In 2007, according to French Health Products Safety Agency, tianeptine's manufacturer Servier agreed to modify the drug's label, following problems with dependency.

Tianeptine has been intravenously injected by drug users in Russia. This method of administration reportedly causes an opioid-like effect and is sometimes used in an attempt to lessen opioid withdrawal symptoms. Tianeptine tablets contain silica and do not dissolve completely. Often the solution is not filtered well thus particles in the injected fluid block capillaries, leading to thrombosis and then severe necrosis. Thus, in Russia tianeptine (sold under the brand name "Coaxil") is a schedule III controlled substance in the same list as the majority of benzodiazepines and barbiturates.

On 6 April 2018 Michigan became the first U.S. state to ban tianeptine sodium, classifying it as a schedule II controlled substance. The scheduling of tianeptine sodium is effective 4 July 2018. The Centers for Disease Control and Prevention (CDC) has expressed concern that tianeptine may be an "emerging public health risk", citing an increase in exposure-related calls to poison control centers in the United States. Alabama's ban took effect March 15, 2021. Tennessee banned it on July 1, 2022. Ohio banned it on December 22, 2022, referencing its availability there as “gas-station heroin.”

A literature review conducted in 2018 found 25 articles involving 65 patients with tianeptine abuse or dependence. Limited data showed that a majority of patients were male and that age ranged from 19 to 67. Routes of intake included oral, intravenous, and insufflation entry. In the 15 cases of overdose, 8 combined ingestion with at least one other substance, of which 3 resulted in death. Six additional deaths are reported involving tianeptine (making it 9 in total). In this report, the amount of tianeptine used ranged from 50 mg/day to 10g/day orally.

On March 13, 2020, with a decree approved by the Minister of Health, Italy became the first European country to ban tianeptine considering it a Class I controlled substance.

See also 
 List of antidepressants
 List of investigational anxiolytics

References

External links 
 Tianeptine – David Pearce – The Good Drug Guide

Amines
Anxiolytics
Chloroarenes
Dibenzothiazepines
Euphoriants
Laboratoires Servier
Mu-opioid receptor agonists
Tricyclic antidepressants
Triketones
Sultams